Bulatovo (Bulat) is a rural locality (a village) in Almukhametovsky Selsoviet, Abzelilovsky District, Bashkortostan, Russia. The population was 155 as of 2010. There are 3 streets.

Geography 
Bulatovo is located 53 km north of Askarovo (the district's administrative centre) by road. Tselinny is the nearest rural locality.

References 

Rural localities in Abzelilovsky District